Ontoko Combined School is a school in the Omusati Region in northern Namibia. The school lies within an area occupied by marginalised communities, particularly Ovahimba, Ovahumbi, Ovazemba, Ovandongona, and Ovangambwe. School patron is Niilo Taapopi, former CEO of the City of Windhoek.

See also
 List of schools in Namibia
 Education in Namibia

References

Schools in Omusati Region